Đorđe Prudnikov (Ђорђе Прудников, Djordje Prudnikoff) (1939 - 2017) was a Russo-Serbian painter, graphic artist, and designer.

Prudnikov was born in Užice, and has been claimed as one of the most original contemporary artists to emerge from the former Yugoslavia.

References

External links
Website of Works
Gallery of Art

Serbian painters
20th-century Russian painters
Russian male painters
21st-century Russian painters
1939 births
Living people
People from Užice
20th-century Russian male artists
21st-century Russian male artists